Xerochlamys diospyroidea is a plant in the family Sarcolaenaceae. It is endemic to Madagascar.

Description
Xerochlamys diospyroidea grows as a shrub or small tree. Its flowers are in inflorescences of two to eight flowers, with pink to white petals.

Distribution and habitat
Xerochlamys diospyroidea is only found in the Ambatofinandrahana District of the central region of Amoron'i Mania. Its habitat is evergreen woods from  altitude.

Conservation
Xerochlamys diospyroidea is threatened by wildfires and by logging for its wood. There are some subpopulations in the Itremo New Protected Area.

References

diospyroidea
Endemic flora of Madagascar
Plants described in 1886
Taxa named by Henri Ernest Baillon